To All the Boys: Always and Forever (Music from the Netflix Film) is the soundtrack to the 2021 film To All the Boys: Always and Forever. It was released on February 12, 2021 by Capitol Records. The film, in its entirety featured over 45 songs: both original, incorporated, existing but previously unreleased tracks. Out of which, 16 tracks were compiled into the soundtrack album, with four original tracks produced for the film. The track "Beginning Middle End", was released as a single on February 10, prior to the soundtrack release.

Development 
For the third instalment, music supervisors and compilers, Laura Webb and Lindsay Wolfington had planned for about 47 songs, as they wanted to keep the tracks, true to Lara Jean's (Lana Condor) character and spirit. According to them, "The lush and dreamy musical landscape of the series also has an unintentional ‘80s influence, which ties in with the trilogy's John Hughes references and LJ's favorite films." For the soundtrack, they chose more K-pop tracks, since most of the story is set in South Korea. Songs from several artists, including bands such as The Greeting Committee, Spice Girls and Blossoms, and indie musicians such as Anna of the North, Leah Nobel, Jordan Suaste, Emmit Fenn among others were chosen to be compiled into the soundtrack.

Track listing

Additional music 
Songs that are featured in the film, but not in the soundtrack, include:

 "Gee" – Girls' Generation
 "Fancy" – Lana Condor, Janel Parrish and Anna Cathcart
 "Q&A" – Cherry Bullet
 "I Love You" – Laureline
 "Affection" – Lady Bri
 "Wannabe" – Sandflower
 "Me and My Mind" – Jazz Morley
 "All Right Now" – David Das
 "You're All I Need to Make It" – Johnson, Hawkins, Tatum, & Durr
 "Tutti Frutti" – Little Richard
 "Pretty Savage" – Blackpink
 "I Like Me Better (Ryan Riback Remix)" – Lauv
 "Heartshaker" – Tom Speight
 "Warm Glow" – Hippo Campus
 "Never Change" – ITS Studios
 "Do Not Disturb" – Dan Cipriano
 "Gold Star" – The Greeting Committee
 "Bambola" – Betta Lemme
 "Don't Speak" – Lune
 "Highway" – Suzi Wu
 "One More Chance" – Charlie Faye & The Fayettes
 "Don't Look Back in Anger" – Oasis
 "Peaches" – Milk & Bone, Alex Lustig
 "Feeling That" – Sioux Sioux
 "These Days" – IOLITE
 "Second Fiddle" – Ann Haggin
 "Real Love" – Ashe
 "I Will Take Care of You" – William Bell
 "Dancing in the Moonlight" – Toploader
 "Feeling Good" – John the Martyr

Release history

Reception 
As similar to the soundtracks of the previous films, Always and Forever received positive critical response. Tamara Fuentess of Seventeen, called the soundtrack as "the best from the previous instalments". Olivia Truffaut Wong of Refinery29 called "the TATB: Always And Forever soundtrack is full of pretty good options. It features a mix of upbeat pop and more mellow indie faire, spanning from K-Pop to Oasis. But the real highlight comes from the inclusion of a few original songs written specifically for the film." Popbuzz called it as "an absolutely banging soundtrack". Abby Monteil of Elite Daily wrote "The songs on the To All The Boys 3 soundtrack is full of catchy tunes that'll leave you ready to fall for the series all over again [...] In many ways, it's the most mature and emotional installment of the franchise to date, which the soundtrack reflects. It also highlights plenty of exciting, upbeat moments."

References 

2021 soundtrack albums
Capitol Records soundtracks